Jan Schäfer (born 18 October 1974 in Dresden) is a German sprint canoer who competed from the late 1990s to the mid-2000s. Competing in two Summer Olympics, he won a silver medal in the K-4 1000 m event at Sydney in 2000.

Schäfer also won a bronze medal in the K-2 1000 m event at the 1999 ICF Canoe Sprint World Championships in Milan.

References
DatabaseOlympics.com profile

Sports-reference.com profile

1974 births
Canoeists at the 2000 Summer Olympics
Canoeists at the 2004 Summer Olympics
German male canoeists
Living people
Olympic canoeists of Germany
Olympic silver medalists for Germany
Sportspeople from Dresden
Olympic medalists in canoeing
ICF Canoe Sprint World Championships medalists in kayak
Medalists at the 2000 Summer Olympics